Jurmey Gewog (Dzongkha: འགྱུར་མེད་) is a gewog (village block) of Mongar District, Bhutan.

References 

Gewogs of Bhutan
Mongar District